The LEAF Trike is an American ultralight trike that was designed and produced by Leading Edge Air Foils in the 1980s. The aircraft was supplied as a kit for amateur construction.

Design and development
It is a very minimalist design and features a cable-braced hang glider-style high-wing, weight-shift controls, a single-seat, open cockpit, tricycle landing gear and a single engine in pusher configuration.

The aircraft frame is made from bolted-together aluminum tubing, with its hang glider wing covered in Dacron sailcloth. The kit was supplied without a wing as any suitable hang glider wing can be used, provided it has adequate gross weight for the pilot and the carriage. The LEAF Talon 215 wing was recommended for the aircraft. The aircraft's gross weight and performance depends on the type of wing used.

The carriage design features a cable in place of the usual front tube, to allows easier folding for ground transportation. The landing gear uses  main wheels and a steerable  nose wheel.

The Trike was later replaced in the LEAF product line by the LEAF Tukan.

Specifications (typical Trike)

References

1980s United States ultralight aircraft
Homebuilt aircraft
Single-engined pusher aircraft
Ultralight aircraft
Ultralight trikes
Leading Edge Air Foils aircraft